Megan Burns (née Sneddon; born 9 September 1985) is a Scottish footballer who plays for Motherwell in the Scottish Women's Premier League. Sneddon made her senior Scotland debut aged 16 and amassed 130 appearances for the national team.

Club career
Sneddon spent five years with Kilmarnock, winning a treble in 2002 aged just 16. In July 2006, she joined Glasgow City. On 18 April 2010, she made her 100th appearance for the club in a 4–2 victory against Spartans.

In February 2011, Sneddon was called into Scotland's Cyprus Cup squad, listed as a Liverpool player. She had decided to leave Glasgow City after growing dissatisfied with the club. Sneddon made her debut for the FA WSL club in a friendly win over Hibernian. However, on the eve of the English season Sneddon signed for Celtic. She cited personal reasons and the advice of Scotland coach Anna Signeul for the decision.

Sneddon signed for Rangers in January 2013.

On 19 August 2015, Sneddon followed in the footsteps of several of her former Scotland teammates by signing for ambitious Motherwell. She said of her signing: "I am delighted that Motherwell have given me the chance to kick start my career. I'm looking forward to getting back on the pitch as I've hardly kicked a ball since November. It will also be great to play alongside some familiar faces as well."

She signed for Motherwell again in 2018.

International career

Sneddon made her senior debut for Scotland the day before her 17th birthday, in an 8–2 defeat to the United States in Columbus, Ohio.

Sneddon was picked for the Scotland U23 women's squad to play at the Nordic Tournament in August 2008. She captained the team at the tournament.

In December 2011, Sneddon was one of four Celtic players to be approached about playing for Team GB at the 2012 Olympics.

She ended her international career after Scotland failed to qualify for the 2015 FIFA Women's World Cup, publicly criticising the tactics of Anna Signeul and also speaking of the difficulties faced by players with various footballing commitments for club and country on top of a job outside the game.

Honours

Individual
 East Kilbride Female Sports Personality of the Year: 2008
 South Lanarkshire Senior Performer of the Year: 2009
 Scottish FA International Player of the Year: 2011
 SWPL Players' Player of the Year: 2013

See also
 List of women's footballers with 100 or more caps
 Scottish FA Women's International Roll of Honour

References

External links
 
Megan Sneddon at Killiefc.com

1985 births
Living people
Scottish women's footballers
Scotland women's international footballers
Sportspeople from East Kilbride
Footballers from Bellshill
Celtic F.C. Women players
Liverpool F.C. Women players
Glasgow City F.C. players
Rangers W.F.C. players
F.C. Kilmarnock Ladies players
FIFA Century Club
Women's association football midfielders
Women's Super League players
Queen's Park F.C. (women) players
Motherwell L.F.C. players
Scottish Women's Premier League players
Footballers from South Lanarkshire